Elisabeth (French: Élisabeth), also known as Isabelle Mabille (1143 – Arras, 28 March 1183), was ruling Countess of Vermandois from 1168 to 1183, and also Countess of Flanders by marriage to Philip I, Count of Flanders. She was the eldest daughter of Ralph I, Count of Vermandois and his second spouse, Petronilla of Aquitaine.

Life
Elisabeth was the second child and oldest daughter of her father; she had an elder brother named Hugh from his first marriage to Eleanor of Champagne. Therefore Elisabeth was second in line to inherit the county. When Elisabeth was aged two, she was joined by a brother also named Ralph; this pushed Elisabeth back to third in line. Around three years later, Elisabeth gained a further sister, Eleonore.

Elisabeth's mother Petronilla was the sister of the much-celebrated Eleanor of Aquitaine, Queen consort of both France and England in her lifetime, this made Elisabeth first cousin to both Richard I of England and John of England.

Ralph had divorced his first wife Eleonore, however his marriage to Petronilla had been viewed as illegitimate by Pope Innocent II, the marriage was later legitimized by Pope Celestine II thus allowing Isabelle Mabile to possibly inherit. However, Ralph divorced Petronilla in 1151 then remarried the following year to Laurette, daughter of Thierry, Count of Flanders.

Marriage

On 14 October 1152, Elisabeth's father died and Hugh was made Count of Vermandois; therefore, Elisabeth returned to second-in-line. In 1159, sixteen-year-old Elisabeth married Philip I, Count of Flanders. The following year, Elisabeth's brother Ralph married Philip's sister Margaret. In the same year, Hugh abdicated from his position as count to become a monk; therefore, Ralph succeeded as count, Elisabeth was then promoted to first in line, her sister Eleonore in second.

Rule
In 1167, Elisabeth's brother Ralph died of leprosy. As his marriage to Margaret had proved childless, Elisabeth inherited the County of Vermandois, which she ruled over jointly with her husband; this pushed Flemish authority further south, to its greatest extent thus far, and threatened to completely alter the balance of power in northern France.

Philip and Elisabeth were childless. In 1175, Philip discovered that Elisabeth was committing adultery and had her lover, Walter de Fontaines, beaten to death. Philip then obtained complete control of her lands in Vermandois from King Louis VII of France. In 1177, when Philip left for the Holy Land, he designated his sister Margaret and her second husband, Baldwin V, Count of Hainaut, as his heirs.

Elisabeth died at Arras on 28 March 1183 aged thirty-nine or forty, prompting King Philip II of France to seize Vermandois on behalf of her sister, Eleonore, who succeeded her. Elisabeth was buried at Amiens Cathedral.

References

1143 births
1183 deaths
Capetian House of Vermandois
12th-century women rulers
12th-century French women
Countesses of Flanders
12th-century French people
12th-century women from the county of Flanders